Elof Ahrle (21 January 1900 – 3 June 1965) was a Swedish actor and film director. He appeared in 80 films between 1920 and 1960. He also directed ten films between 1942 and 1950. He was married to actress Birgit Rosengren (1912-2011).

Selected filmography

 The Phantom Carriage (1921)
 The Boys of Number Fifty Seven (1935)
 65, 66 and I (1936)
 Shipwrecked Max (1936)
 Russian Flu (1937)
 Oh, Such a Night! (1937)
 Comrades in Uniform (1938)
 The Great Love (1938)
 Just a Bugler (1938)
 Wanted (1939)
 Oh, What a Boy! (1939)
 Alle man på post (1940)
 Heroes in Yellow and Blue (1940)
 Fransson the Terrible (1941)
 Tre glada tokar (1942)
 Mister Collins' Adventure (1943)
 Live Dangerously (1944)
 Blåjackor (1945)
 Motherhood (1945)
 Onsdagsväninnan (1946)
 Pengar – en tragikomisk saga (1946)
 Song of Stockholm (1947)
 Soldier's Reminder (1947)
 Maria (1947)
 Life at Forsbyholm Manor (1948)
 Loffe the Tramp (1948)
 Loffe as a Millionaire (1948)
  My Sister and I (1950)
 Two Stories Up (1950)
 The Motor Cavaliers (1950)
 While the City Sleeps (1950)
 Skipper in Stormy Weather (1951)
 Say It with Flowers (1952)
 The Chieftain of Göinge (1953)
 Bill Bergson and the White Rose Rescue (1953)
Taxi 13 (1954)
 Men in the Dark (1955)
 The Summer Wind Blows (1955)
 The Dance Hall (1955)
 Paradise (1955)
 Rasmus, Pontus och Toker (1956)
 Never in Your Life (1957)
 The Jazz Boy (1958)
 Pirates on the Malonen (1959)
 The Judge (1960)

References

External links

1900 births
1965 deaths
People from Nyköping Municipality
Swedish male film actors
Swedish film directors
20th-century Swedish male actors